Samuel H. Shapiro Developmental Center, formerly named the Kankakee State Hospital, is a developmental center in Kankakee, Illinois, on the banks of the Kankakee River.

History
In 1877, the General Assembly established the Illinois Eastern Hospital for the Insane and empowered the Governor to appoint a seven-member commission to select a site within northeastern Illinois on which to locate the institution. After selection of a site in Kankakee, three trustees were appointed by the Governor to supervise planning and construction, choose a superintendent, and operate the hospital, subject to inspection by the Board of State Commissioners of Public Charities.

The hospital opened on September 4, 1879, and began to operate a training school for nurses in 1886. When the Board of State Commissioners of Public Charities was abolished in 1909, the institute was reorganized and renamed Kankakee State Hospital, effective January 1, 1910.

In 1917, the Department of Public Welfare assumed responsibility for the Kankakee State Hospital and retained control until the creation of the Department of Mental Health in 1961 (L. 1961, p. 2666). On May 10, 1974, the institution became a center for the care and treatment of the developmentally disabled only. All other patients were transferred to other mental health facilities and the institution became the Shapiro Developmental Center.  It was renamed the Samuel H. Shapiro Developmental Center in honor of the Illinois Governor, Samuel H. Shapiro (1968–1969), who had resided in Kankakee.

Today
As of the end of fiscal year 2008, the center had 1,119 employees, 587 residents and an annual cost per resident of $175,844. The Shapiro Center was generating and submitting to the state treasury, 65% of its total operational costs.

There are underground utility tunnels leading from building to building in the facility. These tunnels were similar to nearby Manteno State Hospital's tunnels. This is a result of having a central steam plant for building heating, and it is typical of hospitals constructed under the Kirkbride Plan.

Notable staff
Adolf Meyer

Notes

References

External links 
Kankakee State info & history
High Definition video from Kirkbrides HD

Hospital buildings completed in 1879
Buildings and structures in Kankakee County, Illinois
Hospitals established in 1879
Kankakee, Illinois
Psychiatric hospitals in Illinois
1879 establishments in Illinois